The 1924 New Hampshire gubernatorial election was held on November 4, 1924. Republican nominee John Gilbert Winant defeated Democratic incumbent Fred H. Brown with 53.94% of the vote.

General election

Candidates
John Gilbert Winant, Republican
Fred H. Brown, Democratic

Results

References

1924
New Hampshire
Gubernatorial